Ruth I. Michler (March 8, 1967 to November 1, 2000) was an American-born mathematician of German descent who lived and worked in the United States. She earned her Ph.D. in Mathematics from the University of California, Berkeley, and she was a tenured associate professor at the University of North Texas. She died at the age of 33 while visiting Northeastern University, after which at least three memorial conferences were held in her honor, and the Ruth I. Michler Memorial Prize was established in her memory.

Early years 
Michler was the daughter of German mathematician  and was born in Ithaca, New York while her family was visiting Cornell University from Germany. She grew up in Germany, living in Tübingen, Giessen, and Essen. She completed her undergraduate studies in 1988 at the University of Oxford, graduating summa cum laude.

Doctoral studies and research 
Michler earned her Ph.D. in Mathematics in 1993 from the University of California, Berkeley. Her dissertation is titled "Hodge components of cyclic homology of affine hypersurfaces." Her advisors were Mariusz Wodzicki and Arthur Ogus. She spent the academic year 1993-1994 as a postdoc at Queen's University working with Leslie Roberts. In 1994, she joined the tenure-track faculty at the University of North Texas where she earned tenure in 2000. She was the author of eleven (11) research articles in commutative algebra and algebraic geometry. She organized several special sessions at meetings of the American Mathematical Society. The session in San Antonio resulted in a conference proceedings which Michler co-edited. In 2000 she was awarded a National Science Foundation POWRE grant to visit Northeastern University.

Memorial conferences and prize 
Michler was killed in an accident in Boston on November 1, 2000, when she was struck by a construction vehicle while riding her bicycle. Several conferences were organized in her honor. Two conferences resulted in a volume of papers dedicated to her memory which includes a dedicatory article and an article describing her research. In 2007 the Association for Women in Mathematics inaugurated the Ruth I. Michler Memorial Prize which is "awarded annually to a woman recently promoted to Associate Professor or an equivalent position in the mathematical sciences".

References 

1967 births
2000 deaths
American women mathematicians
20th-century women mathematicians
Alumni of the University of Oxford
University of California, Berkeley alumni
University of North Texas faculty
20th-century American mathematicians
Mathematicians from New York (state)
People from Ithaca, New York
Road incident deaths in Massachusetts
Cycling road incident deaths
20th-century American women